Erich Loewenhardt was a German fighter ace of the First World War, credited with 54 confirmed aerial victories while flying with Jagdstaffel 10.

List of victories

Footnotes

Sources

Aerial victories of Loewenhardt, Erich
Loewenhardt, Erich